Global Mall Pingtung is a shopping mall in Pingtung City, Pingtung County, Taiwan that opened on December 15, 2012.

History
 A groundbreaking ceremony was held on July 29, 2011
 On December 15, 2012, Global Mall Pingtung was opened, becoming the third branch of Global Mall and the first outside New Taipei City.
 In September 2020, the mall was renovated to include an outlet section.

See also
 List of tourist attractions in Taiwan
 Global Mall Taoyuan A8
 Global Mall Xinzuoying Station

References

External links

2012 establishments in Taiwan
Shopping malls in Taiwan
Shopping malls established in 2012